"I Don't Care" is a 1905 song, words by Jean Lenox, music by Harry O. Sutton, originally performed by Eva Tanguay, becoming her most famous song. It was published by Jerome H. Remick & Co., New York,  performed in the Ziegfeld Follies of 1909 and recorded by Eva Tanguay in 1922. It was also recorded by Judy Garland, Mitzi Gaynor and Eydie Gorme among others, sometimes with additional lyrics.

References

1905 songs